Lingis is a surname. Notable people with the surname include:

Alphonso Lingis (born 1933), American philosopher, writer and translator
Antanas Lingis (1905–1941), Lithuanian footballer